Robert 'Rob' Durham (born June 1, 1983) is a former American football defensive back.

Professional career

Hamburg Sea Devils
In 2007, Durham was drafted by the Hamburg Sea Devils. He did not record any statistics.

Amsterdam Admirals
Durham finished 2007 with the Amsterdam Admirals. He did not record any statistics.

Columbus Destroyers
In 2008, Durham was assigned to the Columbus Destroyers. He saw minimal action for the Destroyers, recording just 5 tackles on the season.

Alabama Vipers
In 2010, Durham was assigned to the Alabama Vipers. He saw much more action, recording 31 tackles.

Georgia Force
In 2011, Durham signed with the Georgia Force. He has his most productive season thus far, registering 80 tackles and 3 interceptions in 2011. He has re-signed with the Force for the 2012 season.

References

External links
 Georgia Force Bio

1983 births
Living people
American football defensive backs
Auburn Tigers football players
Georgia Force players
Columbus Destroyers players
Alabama Vipers players